NPA may refer to:

Organizations and companies
 National Parks Association (disambiguation)
 National People's Action, a community organizing network
 National Pasta Association, an association for the United States pasta industry
 National Pawnbrokers Association, an American-based trade association
 National Physicians Alliance, a multi-specialty medical organization in the United States
 National Postdoctoral Association, an organization for postdoctoral researchers in the United States
 National Prescription Administrators, a former pharmaceutical company in the United States
 Natural Philosophy Alliance, a group that believes mainstream physics and cosmology are wrong
 Network Printing Alliance, a group of printer manufacturers
 Network Professional Association, an advocate for the international network computing professional in the United States
 Northern Pacific Airways, a US low-cost airline
 Norwegian People's Aid, a non-governmental labour and humanitarian organization in Norway
 National Pharmacy Association of the UK

Government and politics
 National Pacification Army, Chinese anti-Kuomintang warlord army formed in 1926
 National park authority, a term used in the United Kingdom for the legal body in charge of a national park
 National Party of Australia, an Australian political party
 National People's Army, the armed forces of the former German Democratic Republic (GDR)
 Sardar Vallabhbhai Patel National Police Academy, Indian national institute for training of Indian Police Service (IPS) officers
 National Police Agency (disambiguation)
 National Port Authority, Liberia
 National Production Authority, a former agency of the United States government for defense mobilization from 1950 to 1953
 National Prosecuting Authority, a governing body of the Republic of South Africa
 New Anticapitalist Party (Nouveau Parti Anticapitaliste), a far-left French political party
 New People's Army, armed wing of the Communist Party of the Philippines
 Nigerian Ports Authority, a government agency that governs and operates the ports of Nigeria
 No party affiliation (disambiguation), a voter or politician who is not affiliated with any political party
 Non-Party Affiliate, a politician who is not affiliated with any political party
 Non-Partisan Association, a civic political party in Vancouver, British Columbia
 Note Printing Australia, a subsidiary of the Reserve Bank of Australia
 Transnet National Ports Authority of South Africa
 NPA Satellite Mapping, a UK remote sensing company
 Non-Prosecution Agreement, a way to avoid prosecution

Science and medicine
 N-Propyl-L-arginine, a chemical substance
 1-N-Naphthylphthalamic acid, an auxin plant hormone transport inhibitor
 Nanopascal (nPa), a unit of pressure
 Nasopharyngeal airway, a tube that is designed to be inserted into the nasal passageway
 Niemann–Pick disease type A, a genetic disorder

Miscellaneous
 Naval Air Station Pensacola (airport code), Pensacola, Florida, USA
 .NET Persistence API, also known as NPersistence
 Non-performing asset, banking term for loans in jeopardy of default, ones that have not paid principal or interest for 90+ days
 Northcoast Preparatory and Performing Arts Academy, a high school in Arcata, California, USA
 Northland Preparatory Academy, a middle and high school in Flagstaff, Arizona, USA
 Numbering Plan Area, a geographic area assigned a three-digit area code in the North American Numbering Plan (NANP)
 Neutral Paralympic Athletes; see Neutral Paralympic Athletes at the 2018 Winter Paralympics